Bucky O'Hare is an arcade game produced by Konami in 1992.

Gameplay
This video game is based on the cartoon television series Bucky O'Hare and the Toad Wars under license from Hasbro, Inc. While it is generally classified as a scrolling beat 'em up game, as the player's character is also armed with a laser gun, it adds elements of a scrolling shooter.

Much like the cartoon, Bucky O'Hare features colorful animation, and voice actors from the series were hired to participate in the game's cut scenes.

The player chooses from four protagonists: Bucky O'Hare, the heroic rabbit captain of the space ship Righteous Indignation; Jenny, an "Aldebaran cat" and telepath; Dead-Eye Duck, a four-armed mallard; and Blinky, a one-eyed android. As in the television series, the characters must stop the Toad Empire from invading extraterrestrial planets and enslaving their peoples; to do so they must shoot their way through an army of brainwashed toads to destroy their evil leader, a computer program known as "Komplex" and release the "Interplanetary Life Force".

The enemies, among them Al Negator, Toadborg, Total Terror Toad, a "Cyborg Spider", the various varieties of Toad Storm Troopers, the Toads' Air Marshall, and "Komplex-2-Go" who featured in the comic book and cartoon series continuities.

Soundtrack
The music for Arcade Bucky 'O Hare were: Planet Warren, Climate Converter, Space River, Toad Star and Komplex was contained on the CD Soundtrack Konami All-Stars 1993: Music Station of Dreams on December 24, 1992.

Reception 
RePlay reported Bucky O'Hare to be the third most-popular arcade game at the time.

See also 
 Bucky O'Hare (NES video game), a 1992 video game also by Konami

References

External links

The only walk-through guide available for this video arcade
Bucky O'Hare at GameFAQs

1992 video games
Side-scrolling beat 'em ups
Run and gun games
Continuity Comics
Konami beat 'em ups
Bucky O'Hare
Arcade video games
Arcade-only video games
Video games based on animated television series
Video games about rabbits and hares
Video games set on fictional planets
Video games developed in Japan
Multiplayer and single-player video games